was a Japanese film actor. He appeared in more than 175 films between 1949 and 1988. He won the award for Best Actor at the 13th Moscow International Film Festival for his role in Hometown. He married the actress Isuzu Yamada in 1950, but they divorced three years later.

Selected filmography

Film
 Mahiru no ankoku (1956)
 The Rice People (1957)
 Zero Focus (1961)
 Immortal Love (1961)
 The Mad Fox (1962)
 Gang vs. G-Men (1962) as Detective Ogata
 Shiroi Kyotō (1966) as Professor Ōkouchi
 The Profound Desire of the Gods (1968)
 Hiken yaburi (1969)
  Gyakuen Mitsusakazuki (1969)
 Yakuza Zessyō (1970)
 Silence (1971)
 Battles Without Honor and Humanity: Deadly Fight in Hiroshima (1973)
 Himiko (1974)
 Castle of Sand (1974)
 Dragon Princess (1976)
 Torakku Yarō: Ippiki Otoko Momojirō (1977) as Sukezaemon Osagawa
 Hometown (1983)
 Tampopo (1985)

Television
 Haru no Sakamichi (1971) as Maeda Toshiie
 Amigasa Jūbei (1974-1975)
 Shiroi Kyotō (1978) as Professor Ōkouchi
 The Yagyu Conspiracy (1978) as Date Masamune
 Sanada Taiheiki (1985-1986)

References

External links

1913 births
1988 deaths
Japanese male film actors
20th-century Japanese male actors
People from Tokyo
Male actors from Tokyo